Evgenia Pavlina (born 20 July 1978) is a former Belarusian rhythmic gymnast who competed as an individual.  She was born in Minsk, Belarus.

Career 

Pavlina started gymnastics at the age of 6 with her first coach Anna Baranova. From age 15 she trained 48 hours per week at club Dynamo Minsk with Belarusian master Galina Krylenko and Natalia Stepanova. Pavlina made her senior debut at the 1993 Medico Cup in Austria, where she placed 3rd in the all-around and took two more bronze medals with clubs and ribbon at the final events.

She got her big break later that year, when teammate Larissa Lukyanenko broke her ankle in training. At 15 years old, Pavlina was called upon to replace Lukyanenko in the 1993 World Championships. She helped the Belarusian placed 5th in the Team Event. Pavlina was not chosen for the 1996 Belarusian Olympic Team, but she did compete in most major International events that year.

After the retirement of Lukyanenko, Pavlina stepped up to become the Belarusian number two. At the 1997 Schmiden International, she scored the all-around silver as well as all four apparatus golds. At the Derjugina Cup she also earned a pair of bronze medals for the all-around and rope. At the Gymnastics Masters competition in Germany, she won a pair of medals in all four apparatus, silver with hoop, bronze with ball, and gold with clubs and ribbon. With Tatiana Ogrizko's retirement the following World Championships, Pavlina took over leadership and became Belarusian number one. she won the silver medal at the 1998 European Championships in all-around, as well as a gold in ribbon and team event. She also finished 3rd in All-around at the 1998 Goodwill Games.

Although Pavlina still competed at  major internationals in 1999, she had begun to be eclipsed by teammate Yulia Raskina. She then retired from the sport by that same year.

References

External links
 

1978 births
Living people
Belarusian rhythmic gymnasts
Gymnasts from Minsk
Medalists at the Rhythmic Gymnastics World Championships
Goodwill Games medalists in gymnastics
Competitors at the 1998 Goodwill Games
20th-century Belarusian women